Dijon Shariff Thames (born July 17, 1991), better known by his stage name Mann (often stylized as MANN), is an American rapper from West Los Angeles, California discovered by record producer J. R. Rotem. He's perhaps best known for his singles "Buzzin'" (featuring 50 Cent) and "The Mack" (featuring Snoop Dogg and Iyaz). Mann was formerly signed to Mercury Records, a division of The Island Def Jam Music Group. He founded, owns and operates the independent imprint Peace Life Quality Recordings, which is currently home to artists Tone Oliver and LanaaMak.

Since 2008, Mann has released four albums and six mixtapes, having collaborated with the likes of Jason Derulo, Jermaine Dupri, T-Pain, Kendrick Lamar, Frank Ocean, and Ty Dolla Sign, among others.

MANN's latest album The Grey Area was released on June 24, 2014.

Early life 
Thames grew up in Los Angeles, and attended Alexander Hamilton High School.

Discography

Studio albums 
 Mann's World (2011)
 The Grey Area (2014)

EPs 
 Fairfax & Pico (2017)

Independent albums 
 "West LA Diaries Vol. 1: Vintage Cutz (2010)
 "West LA Diaries Vol. 2: Near Life Experience (2011)
 West LA Diaries Vol. 3: Birthday Philosophy (2011)

Official mixtapes 
 Tell A Friend (2011)
 The Re-Introduction (2012)
 FMOV: Freshmann On Varsity (2012)
 The L.I.S.A. EP (2013)
 The Expansion Tape (2013)

Singles

As lead artist

As featured artist

Guest appearances

References 

Rappers from Los Angeles
1991 births
Living people
African-American male rappers
West Coast hip hop musicians
21st-century American rappers
21st-century American male musicians
21st-century African-American musicians